Events from the year 1996 in Sweden

Incumbents
 Monarch – Carl XVI Gustaf
 Prime Minister – Ingvar Carlsson, succeeded by Göran Persson

Events
Connect/Disconnect one-act musical premieres in Gothenburg.
 Establishment of the Tresticklan National Park.

Popular culture

Literature
 Sorgegondolen, poetry collection by Tomas Tranströmer, winner of the August Prize.

Film
25 December – Private Confessions released

Television
Mysteriet på Greveholm
Skilda världar, soap opera from 1996 to 2002
Vänner och fiender, soap opera from 1996 to 2000
Robin, cartoon series

Sports 
The 1996 Allsvenskan was won by IFK Göteborg
At the 1996 Summer Olympics, Sweden had 177 participants, and achieved eight medals (2 gold, 4 silver, 2 bronze).

Births
29 April – Gustav Engvall, football player
18 July – Yung Lean, musician
10 October – Oscar Zia, singer

Deaths

16 January – Kurt Svanström, football player (born 1915)
11 February – Olle Åhlund, football player (born 1920).
28 April – Svea Holst, film actress (born 1901)
14 March – Maj Sønstevold, composer (born 1917).
19 June – Edvin Wide, runner, Olympic medalist 1920, 1924 and 1928 (born 1896).
2 July – Ingvar Pettersson, athlete (born 1926)
13 September – Håkan Sundin, 54, Swedish bandy player
6 December – Olof Sundby, bishop, archbishop of Uppsala (born 1917)
12 December – Olle Tandberg, heavyweight boxer (born 1918)

See also
 1996 in Swedish television

References

 
Years of the 20th century in Sweden
Sweden
1990s in Sweden
Sweden